NDRE or Ndre may refer to:

 National Defence Radio Establishment, Swedish signals intelligence agency
 Normalized Difference Red Edge Index, a metric for vegetation
 Norwegian Defence Research Establishment, military research and development agency

People with the given name Ndre
 Ndre Mjeda (1866–1937), Albanian poet and activist
 Andrea Bogdani ( 1600-1683), also known as Ndre Bogdani, Albanian scholar and prelate of the Roman Catholic Church

See also
 Ndrek Luca (1927–1995), an Albanian actor